This page provides a partial list of television shows shooting in New York City.

In 2011, 23 TV shows were shot in New York while only nine shows were a decade before.

Shows filmed primarily on location and/or using studio facilities in the Five Boroughs
3AM (2015)
30 Rock (2006–2013)
666 Park Ave. (2012–2013)
All My Children (1970–2009) - moved to Los Angeles in 2010
America's Got Talent (2012–2015)
The Americans (2013–2018)
Another World (1964–1999)
Armstrong Circle Theater
Arthur Godfrey and His Friends
Arthur Godfrey's Talent Scouts
As the World Turns (1956–2010)
The Bedford Diaries (2006)
The Black Donnellys (2006–2007)
Blue Bloods (2010–present)
Boardwalk Empire (2010–2014)
Bored to Death (2009–2011)
Broad City (2014–2019)
Calucci's Department (September–December 1973)
Captain Kangaroo (1955–1984)
Car 54, Where are You? (1961–1963)
The Carrie Diaries (2012–2014)
Cashmere Mafia (2008)
The Colbert Report (2005–2014)
Conviction (2006)
Cosby (1996–2000)
The Cosby Mysteries (1994–1995)
The Cosby Show (1984–1992)
Crashing (2017–2019)
The Daily Show
Damages (2007–2012)
The Days and Nights of Molly Dodd (1989–1991)
The Defenders (2010–2011)
Delocated (2000–2013)
The Dick Cavett Show
Dick Clark's New Year's Rockin' Eve (1972–present)
The Dr. Oz Show
East Side/West Side
The Ed Sullivan Show
The Edge of Night (1956–1984) 
Elementary (2012–2019)
The Equalizer (1985–1989)
The Following (2013–2015)
Flight of the Conchords (2007–2009)
Fringe (2008–2013)
A Gifted Man (2011–2012)
Girls (2012–2017)
The Goldbergs (1949–1956)
Golden Boy (2013)
The Good Wife (2009–2016)
Gossip Girl (2007–2012) 
Gotham (2014–2019)
Guiding Light (1952–August 14, 2009) - since 2008, shooting 1/5 of its scenes on location in Peapack, New Jersey
Heroes (2006–2010)
The Honeymooners (1955–1956)
Hope & Faith (2003–2006)
How to Make It in America (2010–2011)
In Treatment (2009–2010)
Inside Amy Schumer (2013–2016)
Daredevil (2015–2018)
Jessica Jones (2015–2018)
Luke Cage (2016–2018)
Iron Fist (2017–present)
Jessie (2011-2015)
The Job (2001–2002)
The Jury (2004)
Kate and Allie (1984–1989)
Kings (2009)
Kraft Television Theatre
Last Week Tonight with John Oliver (2014–present) 
Late Night with David Letterman (1982–) 
Late Night with Conan O'Brien (1993–2009)
Late Night with Jimmy Fallon (2009–2014)
Late Night with Seth Meyers (2014–present)
Late Show with David Letterman (1993–2015)
Late Show with Stephen Colbert (2015–present)
Law & Order (1990–2010)
Law & Order: Criminal Intent (2001–2011)
Law & Order: Organized Crime (2021–)
Law & Order: Special Victims Unit (1999–present)
Law & Order: Trial by Jury (2005)
Life on Mars (2008–2009)
Lipstick Jungle (2008)
Live (1983–present)
Louie (2010–2015)
Love & Hip Hop (2011–Present)
Love Monkey (2006)
Love of Life (1951–80)
Love Life (2021 - Present)
Made in Jersey (2012)
Mama (1949–1957)
Manifest (2018–present) 
Martha Stewart
The Merv Griffin Show (1965–1970)
Mob Wives (2011)
Naked City (1958–1963)
New Amsterdam (2008)
New York Undercover (1994–1998)
The Newsroom  (2012–2014)
Nurse Jackie (2009–2015)
NYC 22 (2011–2012)
N.Y.P.D. (1967–1969)
One Life to Live (1968–2011; series last aired in 2012)
Once Upon a Time (2011–2018)
Orange Is the New Black (2013–present)
Pan Am (2011–2012)
The Patty Duke Show (1963–1966) - production moved to Los Angeles midway through final season
The Phil Silvers Show (AKA: You'll Never Get Rich} (1955-1959) Final season shot in Los Angeles.
Person of Interest (2011–2016)
Rescue Me (2004–2010)
Royal Pains (2009–2016)
Ryan's Hope (1975–1989)
Saturday Night Live (1975–present)
Search for Tomorrow (1951–1986)
The Secret Storm (1954–1974)
Sesame Street (1969–present)
Sex and the City (1998–2004)
Shining Time Station (1989) - after season one, shooting in Toronto
Smash (2012–2013)
Spin City (1996–2002) - after season four, filming in Los Angeles
Stage Show (1954–1956)
Stanley (1956–1957)
Third Watch (1999–2005)
Today (1952–present)
The Tonight Show (1954–1972, 2014–) 
Tonight Starring Steve Allen (1954–1957)
Tonight! America After Dark (1957)
Tonight Starring Jack Paar (1957–1962)
The Tonight Show Starring Johnny Carson (1962–1972) - moved to Burbank, California in 1972
The Tonight Show Starring Jimmy Fallon (2014–present)
The Wendy Williams Show (2008–2022)
Ugly Betty (2006–2010) - pilot and season 3 onward
Unbreakable Kimmy Schmidt (2015–present)
Unforgettable (2011–2016)
The United States Steel Hour (1953–1963)
Wallflowers (2012–present) - web series
Watch What Happens Live (2009–present)
Westinghouse Studio One
White Collar (2009–2014)

Shows filmed using studio facilities in the Five Boroughs but with significant location shooting elsewhere
The Sopranos (1999–2007) - Silvercup Studios in Queens, most location shooting in New Jersey, some in New York City
The Book of Daniel (2006) - Silvercup Studios in Queens, various suburban locations, church scenes at All Saints Church, Pasadena, California

Shows filmed primarily elsewhere but have some location shooting in the Five Boroughs
All with primary filming in Los Angeles-area studios, unless otherwise noted.
Becker (1998–2004)
Blind Justice (2005)
Brooklyn South (1997–1998)
CSI: NY (2004–2013)
Friends (1994–2004)
How I Met Your Mother (2005–2014)
Kojak (1973–1978)
Mad About You (1992–1999)
McCloud (1970–1977)
NYPD Blue (1993–2005)
The Odd Couple (1970–1975)
Rules of Engagement (2007–2013)
Seinfeld (1989–1998)
Suits (2011–2016) - primary filming in Toronto
Will & Grace (1998–2006)

See also
 List of fiction set in Chicago
 List of films and television shows set in Miami
 List of films set in New York City
 List of television shows set in Los Angeles
 List of television shows set in New York City
 List of television shows set in Washington, D.C.
 San Francisco in popular culture

References 

Television
New York City-related lists
American television-related lists
New York City in popular culture